Leslie George Hurry (10 February 1909– 20 November 1978) was a British artist and set designer for ballet, theatre and opera.

Biography
Hurry was born in London, where his father, A. G. Hurry, was a funeral director in St John's Wood. Leslie Hurray was educated at Haberdashers' Aske's Boys' School before, resisting pressure to join the family business, he attended St. John's Wood Art School and the Royal Academy Schools. Leaving the Royal Academy School of Painting in 1931, before the completion of his five-year scholarship, his first commission was from a brewing firm to decorate a chain of saloon bars with landscape murals.

In the second half of the 1930s he wandered Britain and Ireland painting landscapes. Depressed with his work and seeking inspiration to develop a personal style, he moved to Brittany then Paris, but was forced to return to Britain due to health problems.

In 1939, found unfit for military service and disturbed by the war, he isolated himself in his secluded cottage at [Buntings, Hundon,[Suffolk]. At this time he was befriended by Grace Sholto Douglas, an elderly patron of arts who died in 1942. In 1940–41 he produced two books of intricate automatic drawings that were exhibited at the Redfern Gallery, leading to his acclaim as an "ultra-surrealist".

His first stage work was for a production of Hamlet for the Sadler's Wells Ballet in 1942, work commissioned by Robert Helpmann, who had seen his paintings in a London gallery. He subsequently worked for Sadler's Wells, the Old Vic, Aldwych Theatre, Glyndebourne, the Royal Opera House, the Royal Shakespeare Company and the theatre in Canada, particularly in Stratford, Ontario.

He left a large corpus of paintings, including abstract, portraiture and landscape works.

References

"Hurry, Leslie George (1909–1978)", Raymond Ingram, Oxford Dictionary of National Biography, Oxford University Press, 2004
Obituary, The Times, Friday, Nov 24, 1978; p. 16
Obituary by Jack Lindsay, The Times, Monday, Nov 27, 1978; p. 14
Leslie Hurry, British Council biography

External links 
Leslie Hurry costume designs, 1966, held by the Billy Rose Theatre Division, New York Public Library for the Performing Arts
 W.H. Crain Costume and Scene Design Collection at the Harry Ransom Center

1909 births
1978 deaths
20th-century English painters
English male painters
Alumni of St John's Wood Art School
Artists from London
British scenic designers
Opera designers
People educated at Haberdashers' Boys' School
20th-century English male artists